The Lewis and Clark Confluence Tower is a  tower on the Illinois bank of the Mississippi River at the confluence of it and the Missouri River. The tower complements the Lewis and Clark State Historic Site, about one mile to the south, where the Lewis and Clark Expedition made winter camp before setting up the Missouri river.

The tower has platforms at 50, 100, and 150 feet, providing a good view of the confluence of the Missouri and Mississippi Rivers. Downtown St. Louis and the Gateway Arch can also be seen from the tower. The tower contains two legs joined by viewing platforms, with an elevator in one leg and stairs in the other. Its construction, lasting from 2002 to 2010, was funded by $5 million from local and state sources.

References

External links
 Confluence Tower — official website
 Confluence Tower on KETC — local public television station KETC profiles the tower

Towers in Illinois
Mississippi River
Missouri River
Buildings and structures in Madison County, Illinois
Towers completed in 2010
Tourist attractions in Madison County, Illinois